The Southeast University School of Architecture (SEU Arch) is one of the professional schools of Southeast University in Nanjing, China. Founded in 1927, SEU School of Architecture is the oldest school of architecture in China and one of the most prestigious. It is ranked among the top three of Chinese architecture schools according to CDGDC, Ministry of Education of China.

History 
The school was renamed several times because of the name change of the university.

Department of Architecture, National Central University (1927–1949) 
Department of Architecture, National Nanjing University (1949–1952) 
Department of Architecture, Nanjing Institute of Technology (1952–1988) 
Southeast University School of Architecture (1988 – Present)

Alumni 
 Wang Shu, Pritzker Architecture Prize winner of 2012
 Yung Ho Chang, former chair of the Department of Architecture, Massachusetts Institute of Technology, U.S.
 Y. C. Wong
 Qi Kang
 Xiu Zelan
 Yang Tingbao
 Tong Jun
 Liu Dunzhen
 Chen Chi-Kwan, former dean of the College of Engineering, Tunghai University, Taiwan
 Wu Liangyong, co-founder and former dean of the School of Architecture, Tsinghua University, China
 Cheng Taining
 Zhong Xunzheng
 Dai Fudong, former dean of the College of Architecture and Urban Planning, Tongji University, China
 Zhang Kaiji
 Zhang Bo, designer of the Great Hall of the People
 Liu Xianjue, architectural historian

References

Southeast University
Architecture schools in China
Educational institutions established in 1927
1927 establishments in China